Nicola Valley Institute of Technology (NVIT) is British Columbia's Aboriginal public post-secondary institute in Merritt, British Columbia, Canada. It started in 1983.

History
NVIT is British Columbia's Aboriginal public post-secondary institute. NVIT was formed as a private institute in 1983 by the First Nations bands of Coldwater, Nooaitch, Shackan, Upper Nicola and Lower Nicola. NVIT was designated as a Provincial Institute under the British Columbia College and Institute Act in 1995. NVIT spent years in the downtown core of Merritt, British Columbia. The Eagles Perch campus opened in 2002.

NVIT is a member of the Indigenous Adult and Higher Learning Association (IAHLA), which was created in 2003 to represent and work on behalf of Aboriginal controlled adult and post-secondary education institutes in British Columbia.

Campus
The Merritt Campus is at 4155 Belshaw Street Merritt, British Columbia V1K 1R1. The Vancouver campus is at 200-4355 Mathissi Place, Burnaby, British Columbia V5G 4S8.

Programs
 
NVIT programs and courses are accredited within the province of British Columbia. 
Aboriginal Community and Health Development 
Aboriginal Community Economic Development 
Aboriginal Early Childhood Education (Merritt only) 
Academic and Indigenous Studies (University Transfer)
Access to Practical Nursing
Administrative Studies (Merritt only)
Bridging to Trades
College Readiness (Merritt and Vancouver Campus) 
Community Education 
Information Technology 
Health Care Assistant
Law Enforcement Preparatory Program (Merritt only) 
Natural Resource Technology (Merritt only) 
Social Work

See also
List of institutes and colleges in British Columbia
List of universities in British Columbia
Higher education in British Columbia
Education in Canada
Institute of Indigenous Government

References

External links
Official website

Educational institutions established in 1983
First Nations education
Indigenous universities and colleges in North America
Nicola Country
Universities and colleges in British Columbia
1983 establishments in British Columbia